PPS-1350 is a Hall-effect thruster, a kind of ion propulsion system for spacecraft. It was used in the SMART-1 mission to the moon and one geostationary satellites: Inmarsat-4A F4.

It creates a stream of electrically charged xenon ions accelerated by an electric field and confined by a magnetic field. The PPS-1350 is built by Snecma, a French aerospace firm, in cooperation with Fakel, who designed the SPT-100, on which the PPS 1350 is based.

Specifications

See also 
 Comparison of orbital rocket engines

References

Ion engines